Earth Songs is the 22nd studio album by American singer-songwriter John Denver released in June 1990.

At the time of its release, it was only available by mail order and at John Denver's concerts. With the exception of tracks 7, 8, and 14 which are new songs; every other track on the album are new versions recorded specifically for this album.  Each of those tracks are indicated with the name and year of the album on which they were first released. Tracks 7 and 8 were also released later in the year on The Flower That Shattered the Stone.

Track listing
All tracks were composed by John Denver unless indicated.

Side one 
 "Windsong" (John Jarvis, Joe Henry) (Windsong, 1975)
 "Rocky Mountain Suite (Cold Nights in Canada)" (Farewell Andromeda, 1973)
 "Rocky Mountain High" (Denver, Mike Taylor) (Rocky Mountain High, 1972)
 "Sunshine on My Shoulders" (Denver, Dick Kniss, Mike Taylor) (Poems, Prayers & Promises, 1971)
 "The Eagle and the Hawk" (Denver, Mike Taylor) (Aerie, 1971)
 "Eclipse" (Back Home Again, 1974)
 "The Flower That Shattered the Stone" (Denver, Joe Henry)

Side two 
 "Raven’s Child" (Denver, Joe Henry)
 "Children of the Universe" (Denver, Joe Henry) (Seasons of the Heart, 1982)
 "To the Wild Country" (I Want to Live, 1977)
 "American Child" (Autograph, 1980)
 "Calypso" (Windsong, 1975)
 "Islands" (Seasons of the Heart, 1982)
 "Earth Day Every Day (Celebrate)"

References

John Denver albums
1990 albums